Garry Charles (born 1973, Bedford, Bedfordshire) is an English award winning writer of horror and fantasy.

Biography

Early life
Charles was born in Bedfordshire on August 16, 1973. His family moved North when he was five years old, resulting in his formative years being spent in Selby, North Yorkshire. Before taking up writing he worked as a butcher, greengrocer and electrician within the coal mining industry. After working underground for thirteen years he moved on to paper mills and food production factories.

2003 - 2008
Charles began penning Heaven's Falling in late 2003, completing a final draft by 2005. Originally one piece, it was split into two volumes, Ascension and Redemption, for printing purposes.

This was followed up by Hammerhead, a novelization based upon the low-budget horror film, The Summer of the Massacre. It is rumoured that he was given free rein to reinvent the film, thereby making the book what the film should have been.

2009 to present
In June 2009 Charles released his fourth novel, Death Tide, as a free download on his website. He is currently working on a new novel entitled 'Slavis', thought to be released later this year. Charles has recently revealed that Slavis will be available from September 1, 2010.

More recently Charles has moved into screenplay writing, and is planning to direct his first short film in the fall of 2010. His is also producing several ventures, most notably Dead Cert - from director Steve Lawson.

Charles also works outside of horror and has scripted Revenge, a Scottish thriller for director Bill Little. The City of Hell is another; a noir like thriller based in the underbelly of the 1930s. This is being produced by Julie Fernandez.

Personal life
Charles currently resides in Yorkshire, England with his wife and children.

He counts Shaun Hutson, Clive Barker and Matthew Reilly amongst his list of literary influences.

Bibliography

Novels
 Heaven's Falling: Ascension  (2005)
 Heaven's Falling: Redemption  (2006)
 Hammerhead: A Summer of Massacre  (2007)
 Death Tide (2009)
 Slavis (September 2010)
Tranquility (TBC)
Shredder (TBC)

Short stories
 Midnight Itch of Uranus (2009) - short graphic novel
 It Comes With the Tide (2009)
 Ghostwriter (2009)

Filmography
 Straw Man  (2009) writer, executive producer
 Horrorcide (2009) short story
 The Horror Pages (2010) writer, executive producer - "A Woman Scorned" segment
 Dead Cert (2010) based on an idea by
 The Horror Vault 3 (2010) executive producer

Awards
The Dead of Night Awards - Best Author (2006)

References

External links
garrycharles.co.uk

Twitter Page

English writers
1973 births
Living people